This is a list of the squads picked for the 2014 ICC Women's World Twenty20 tournament.

Australia
 Meg Lanning (captain)
 Alex Blackwell (vice-captain)
 Nicole Bolton 
 Jess Cameron 
 Sarah Coyte
 Rene Farrell
 Holly Ferling
 Alyssa Healy (wk)
 Julie Hunter
 Jess Jonassen
 Delissa Kimmince
 Beth Mooney
 Erin Osborne
 Ellyse Perry
 Elyse Villani

Bangladesh
 Salma Khatun (captain)
 Ayasha Rahman
 Fahima Khatun
 Farzana Hoque
 Jahanara Alam
 Khadija Tul Kubra
 Lata Mondal
 Nuzhat Tasnia
 Panna Ghosh 
 Rumana Ahmed
 Sanjida Islam 
 Shaila Sharmin 
 Shamima Sultana (wk)
 Sharmin Akhter
 Shohaly Akther

England
 Charlotte Edwards (captain)
 Tamsin Beaumont
 Kate Cross
 Jodie Dibble
 Georgia Elwiss
 Lydia Greenway
 Rebecca Grundy
 Jenny Gunn
 Danielle Hazell
 Amy Jones (wk)
 Heather Knight
 Nat Sciver
 Anya Shrubsole
 Sarah Taylor (wk)
 Frances Wilson

India
 Mithali Raj (captain)
 Harmanpreet Kaur (vice-captain)
 Soniya Dabir
 Jhulan Goswami
 Karu Jain (wk)
 Latika Kumari
 Smriti Mandhana
 Madhuri Mehta
 Sravanthi Naidu
 Shikha Pandey
 Shubhlakshmi Sharma
 Gouher Sultana
 Vellaswamy Vanitha
 Poonam Yadav

Ireland
 Isobel Joyce (captain)
 Laura Delany
 Emma Flanagan
 Jennifer Gray 
 Cecelia Joyce
 Amy Kenealy
 Louise McCarthy
 Kate McKenna 
 Lucy O'Reilly
 Eimear Richardson
 Rebecca Rolfe
 Melissa Scott-Hayward
 Clare Shillington
 Elena Tice
 Mary Waldron (wk)

New Zealand
 Suzie Bates (captain)
 Nicola Browne
 Samantha Curtis
 Sophie Devine
 Maddy Green
 Holly Huddleston
 Hayley Jensen
 Felicity Leydon-Davis
 Sara McGlashan (wk)
 Frances Mackay
 Katey Martin (wk)
 Morna Nielsen
 Katie Perkins
 Rachel Priest (wk)

Pakistan
 Sana Mir (captain)
 Bismah Maroof (vice-captain)
 Asmavia Iqbal
 Batool Fatima (wk)
 Javeria Khan
 Marina Iqbal
 Nahida Khan
 Nain Abidi
 Nida Dar
 Qanita Jalil
 Sadia Yousuf
 Sania Khan
 Sidra Ameen
 Sumaiya Siddiqi

South Africa
 Mignon du Preez (captain)
 Trisha Chetty (wk)
 Moseline Daniels
 Shandre Fritz
 Shabnim Ismail
 Marizanne Kapp
 Lizelle Lee
 Marcia Letsoalo
 Sunette Loubser
 Suné Luus
 Nadine Moodley
 Chloe Tryon
 Yolandi van der Westhuizen
 Dane van Niekerk

Sri Lanka
 Shashikala Siriwardene (captain)
 Chamari Atapattu (vice-captain)
 Nilakshi de Silva
 Chandima Gunaratne
 Eshani Lokusuriyage
 Yashoda Mendis
 Hasini Perera
 Chamari Polgampola
 Udeshika Prabodhani
 Oshadi Ranasinghe
 Deepika Rasangika
 Maduri Samuddika
 Rebeca Vandort (wk)
 Sripali Weerakkody

West Indies
 Merissa Aguilleira (captain and wk)
 Shemaine Campbelle
 Shanel Daley
 Deandra Dottin
 Chinelle Henry
 Stacy-Ann King
 Kycia Knight (wk)
 Kyshona Knight
 Natasha McLean
 Anisa Mohammed
 Subrina Munroe
 Shaquana Quintyne
 Shakera Selman
 Tremayne Smartt
 Stafanie Taylor

See also
 2014 ICC World Twenty20 squads

References

External links
 2014 ICC Women's World Twenty20 squads on ESPN CricInfo

ICC Women's World Twenty20 squads
2014 ICC Women's World Twenty20